The Honeyman Hardware Company Building is a historic commercial building located at 832 NW Hoyt Street in Northwest Portland, Oregon. It was completed in 1912 and was listed on the National Register of Historic Places on December 15, 1989.

See also
 National Register of Historic Places listings in Northwest Portland, Oregon

References

Further reading

1912 establishments in Oregon
Commercial buildings completed in 1912
Commercial buildings on the National Register of Historic Places in Oregon
Commercial Style architecture in the United States
National Register of Historic Places in Portland, Oregon
Pearl District, Portland, Oregon
Portland Historic Landmarks